The Vision Montreal Crisis of 1997 was a severe political crisis in Montreal, Canada. In January the mayor of Montreal, Pierre Bourque of the Vision Montreal Party, attempted to dismiss two fellow party members from the city's executive committee. This led several party members to defect, complicating governance and undermining party credibility for the remainder of Bourque's term.

Origins

In January 1997, Mayor Pierre Bourque tried to dismiss two members of Montreal's executive committee: Deputy Chairman Sammy Forcillo and Pierre Goyer.  Yet, the city charter of 1921 clearly states that appointments to the executive committee are irrevocable.  Forcillo and Goyer left Vision Montreal (Bourque's party) to sit as independents, but exercised their right to stay on the committee.  Therefore, management by consensus became nearly impossible to reach for the remainder of Bourque's term.

That incident as well as allegations of authoritarian tendencies led thirteen other Vision Montreal councillors to leave the party and sit as independents with their colleagues of the opposition.

Consequences

By August 1997, only a minority of the council members (24 out of 51) were members of Vision Montreal and the credibility of the Bourque administration was undermined.  Most of the defectors were supporters of Jacques Duchesneau's Nouveau Montréal party, but others backed Jean Doré's Équipe Montréal, the RCM or even came back to Vision Montreal briefly before the next election.  The severity of the crisis was such that for a while it appeared to seriously affect Bourque's chances of re-election.

Nonetheless, Bourque was re-elected in 1998, as were a substantial majority of his candidates.

Defectors

The defectors were:

{| border="1" cellpadding="5" cellspacing="0" style="border-collapse: collapse border-color: #444444"
|- bgcolor="darkgray"
| 
|Councilmember
|District
|Status following the 1998 Election

|Serge-Éric BélangerSault-au-RécolletRe-elected as a Vision Montreal candidate

|Philippe BissonnetteSaint-PaulElected as a Nouveau Montréal candidate

|Daniel BoucherJean-RivardDefeated as an Independent candidate

|Vittorio CapparelliFrançois-PerraultDefeated as an RCM candidate

|Jack ChadirdjianDarlingtonDefeated as a Nouveau Montréal candidate

|Jacques CharbonneauLouis-RielRe-elected as a Vision Montreal candidate

|Hubert DeraspeLouis-HébertDid not run for re-election

|Sammy ForcilloSaint-JacquesElected as an Équipe Montréal candidate 

|Pierre GagnierCartiervilleDefeated as a Nouveau Montréal candidate

|Robert GagnonÉmardDefeated as an Independent candidate

|Pierre GoyerSaint-ÉdouardDefeated as an Équipe Montréal candidate

|Robert LaraméePère-MarquetteDefeated as a Nouveau Montréal candidate 

|Marie LebeauPointe-aux-TremblesDefeated as a Nouveau Montréal candidate

|Martin LemaySainte-MarieDefeated as an Équipe Montréal candidate 

|Nathalie MalépartMaisonneuveDid not run for re-election

|Germain PrégentSaint-PierreElected as a Nouveau Montréal candidate

|}

Members of the executive committee are indicated with bold fonts.

References

Politics of Montreal
1997 in Quebec
History by political party
Municipal political parties in Montreal
1997 in Canadian politics